is a town located in Rumoi Subprefecture, Hokkaido, Japan.

As of September 2016, the town has an estimated population of 3,277 and a density of 5.2 persons per km2. The total area is 627.29 km2.

Climate

Mascot

Obira's mascot is  who is a curious and kind heart superhero that resembles a bull. Legend has it that this figure was formed from a bull, a melon, an octopus, two scallops, two fishes and a rice bowl on August 12, 2014. No one knows its gender yet. It can eat anything that is locally produced especially melon, beef, octopus, scallops, herring and rice. His charm point is a red star on his forehead to show its status has mascot of the town.

References

External links

Official Website 

Towns in Hokkaido